Lucky Chops is an American band from New York City formed in 2006. The band started at Fiorello H. LaGuardia High School and was founded by sousaphone player Raphael Buyo along with trombonist Josh Holcomb and saxophonist and clarinetist Daro Behroozi. The band was originally formed for a parade of Filipino culture that Buyo wanted to participate in; after that they began busking on street corners and in subway stations, Union Square. During their time at college, they decided to take their band to a professional level.

The name "Lucky Chops" was proposed by the band's original trumpet player, Daniel Ratkowski, during a word-association brainstorming session and refers to the fact that all of their instruments (except the drums) are wind.

Their early music was mainly covers and mash-ups of other songs. Their original works are influenced by the vast mix of cultures in NYC and are very personal to the member of the band who wrote the piece in question. This means the band performs a wide variety of musical styles and are not bound by a single genre.

The band had a steady start, playing in the New York Subway for commuters. They gained brief internet fame from a 2016 YouTube video showing their rendition of "Funky Town" and "I Got You (I Feel Good)" featuring Leo P, which helped to significantly boost their popularity. Now they perform all over the world. Around the time of their internet fame, they released their first album, Lucky Chops NYC.

The band has seen over 50 musicians play with them over the past 14 years, including Grace Kelly and Sunny Jain. They are also the live house band of the MTV show Girl Code Live.

Discography

Lucky Chops NYC (2016)
2016 World Tour (2016)
Walter (EP) (2017)
Virtue and Vice Sessions Vol. 1 (2018)
Lucky Chops (2019)
Virtue and Vice Sessions Vol. 2 (EP) (2020)
2014 (2020)
Live in L.A. (2021)
New Day (2022)

Member timeline 
Please note this timeline starts in 2014 when the band began playing professionally, not in 2006 when the band was formed.

Members (current) 
 Daro Behroozi - tenor saxophone, baritone saxophone, clarinet, bass clarinet, contrabass clarinet
 Josh Holcomb - trombone
 Joshua Gawel - trumpet
 Adrian Condis - baritone saxophone
 Ben Holcomb - drums
 Nora Nalepka - sousaphone

Gallery

See also 
 Moon Hooch
 Too Many Zooz
 Leo Pellegrino
 Meute (band)
 Youngblood Brass Band

External links 
 Official Website
 Official YouTube Channel

References 

Musical groups from New York City